Unrelated is an upcoming American comedy television series that is set to premiere on Freeform.

Premise
Unrelated begins when "self-absorbed Jesi and conservative, over-achiever Becca go from strangers to sisters when they find out through a genetic testing company that they share the same birth mother in this contemporary ensemble comedy about identity, self-discovery and what ultimately defines us.

Cast and characters
 Jordin Sparks as Becca
 Matt Shively as Matt
 Kris D. Lofton as Todd
 Gigi Zumbado as Jesi
 Jessika Van as Luna
 Davi Santos as Simon

Production

Development
On May 15, 2018, it was announced that Freeform had given the production a series order. The show was created by Kenya Barris and Ranada Shepard, both of whom were expected to serve as executive producers. Production companies involved with the series were slated to include ABC Signature Studios. On October 29, 2018, it was reported that Casey Johnson and David Windsor had joined Shepard as co-creators and showrunners, while Barris had exited writing and showrunning duties but would remain on board the production as an executive producer. It was further reported that Randall Winston would serve as an additional executive producer for the series. On March 6, 2019, the series was renamed from Besties to Unrelated. On July 2, 2019, it was announced that series will not be moving forward to production; instead, it will be redeveloped at Freeform.

Casting
On February 5, 2019, it was announced during the Television Critics Association's annual winter press tour that the series would star Jordin Sparks, Matt Shively, and Brooks Brantly. In mid-February 2019, it was reported that Gigi Zumbado, Jessika Van and Davi Santos had been cast in series regular roles. On March 8, 2019, it was announced that Brooks Brantly was replaced by Kris D. Lofton.

References

English-language television shows
Freeform (TV channel) original programming
Television series by ABC Signature Studios
Upcoming comedy television series